Massey is an unincorporated community in Kent County, Maryland, United States. Massey is located at the intersection of Maryland routes 299, 313 and 330, southeast of Galena.

Education
It is in the Kent County Public Schools. Kent County Middle School is in Chestertown, and Kent County High School is in an unincorporated area, in the Butlertown CDP with a Worton postal address.

The community was formerly assigned to Millington Elementary School. In 2017 the school board voted to close Millington Elementary School.

References

External links 

Map of Massey's P.O., from the Historical Society of Kent County collection
Massey Air Museum

Unincorporated communities in Kent County, Maryland
Unincorporated communities in Maryland